Since the current state highway system in California, United States, was designated, several routes have been deleted from the system by the California Department of Transportation (Caltrans) and the California State Legislature.

State Route 5  
 

State Route 5 followed the route of current SR 35 along Skyline Boulevard. It headed north along the ridges of the Santa Cruz Mountains from SR 17 near the Santa Clara-Santa Cruz county border to SR 1 in San Francisco. SR 5 was deleted in 1964 with the creation of Interstate 5 and was renumbered SR 35.

State Route 7 (Original) 
 

State Route 7 ran from SR 1 near SR 47 in Long Beach to Valley Boulevard in Monterey Park as the Long Beach Freeway. Originally running as State Route 15 in 1934, the route was changed to prevent confusion with I-15. In 1985, SR 7 was deleted and has since been renumbered as Interstate 710. SR 7 was redesignated in Calexico from I-8 near Holtville to the United States/Mexico border in 1990. This route was completed in 2005.

State Route 11 (Original) 
 

State Route 11 followed the route of current Interstate 110 and State Route 110 along the Harbor Freeway. It initially followed surface streets until the 1940s when the Arroyo Seco Parkway was completed. The Harbor Freeway, which was constructed to interstate standards, opened in phases from the late 1950s to the 1970s and SR 11 was since transferred to that route. In December 1978, the Harbor Freeway was approved as an Interstate Highway by the FHWA. In 1981, SR 11 was deleted and has since been renumbered as Interstate 110 on the Harbor Freeway, and State Route 110 on the Pasadena Freeway (later Arroyo Seco Parkway).

SR 11 was redesignated in San Diego from SR 905 near SR 125 to the United States/Mexico border in 1994 and the first segment opened in 2016.

State Route 21 
 

State Route 21 closely followed the route of current Interstate 680. It began in San Jose heading northeast from I-280 and US 101 and closely paralleling SR 17 (now I-880) until reaching Fremont. From there, SR 21 headed northeast toward Pleasanton and intersected I-580. SR 21 then headed northwest to Concord and Martinez, California, intersecting SR 24 and SR 4 before reaching the Carquinez Strait. In Benicia, SR 21 intersected with SR 141 (now I-780) and ended in Fairfield at I-80.
 
The route was added to the Interstate Highway System in 1973. This became the new alignment of I-680, and the old route to Vallejo became I-780. SR 21 was then deleted in 1976 once corresponding changes were made by the state legislature.

State Route 26 (Original) 
 

State Route 26 was a state highway in Los Angeles and Orange counties in the U.S. state of California, from 1937 to 1964. It traveled from U.S. Route 101 Alternate (US 101 Alt.) in Santa Monica to SR 39 in Buena Park.

The route was assigned pre-1964 Legislative Route 173 (LR 173), defined in 1933 from Santa Monica to East Los Angeles. Between Santa Monica and Los Angeles, it was later replaced by the Santa Monica Freeway, and added to the Interstate Highway System on September 15, 1955. East of East Los Angeles, it was assigned LR 166.

The highway originally traveled along 10th Street in Los Angeles, but as Olympic Boulevard was built out to the west and east, it was aligned to that. East of Los Angeles, the highway turned southeast along the Anaheim Telegraph Road, which it followed into Santa Fe Springs. It then continued along Los Nietos Road, Valley View Avenue, and Stage Road before its terminus at La Habra Road (now Beach Boulevard). The portion east of Downtown Los Angeles was eventually deleted from the system as redundant to US 101 Byp. which later became Interstate 5 (I-5).

The highway was known as State Route 6 from 1934 to 1937. The current SR 26 bears no relation to this highway.

State Route 30

State Route 30 ran from Interstate 210 in San Dimas to Interstate 10 in Redlands through San Bernardino. It was built to freeway standards between Interstate 215 in San Bernardino and Interstate 10 and between the current terminus of State Route 57 in San Dimas to Foothill Boulevard in La Verne. When the freeway section between Foothill Boulevard and Interstate 215 was completed in 2007, the route was decommissioned and renumbered SR 210. It is expected to be incorporated into the Interstate highway system at some later date as an extension of Interstate 210.

State Route 31

State Route 31 ran from State Route 91 near Corona to Interstate 15 in Devore through San Bernardino. The route was deleted in 1974, when it was added to the interstate system. After being signed California 31, It was signed Temporary Interstate 15, and later, after being moved from Main Street in Corona, Hamner Avenue in Riverside County north of Corona, and Milliken Avenue in San Bernardino County to the Ontario Freeway. The route became Interstate 15.

State Route 35 (Original)

State Route 35 originally ran north to south from State Route 22 to US 99, first along Los Alamitos Boulevard in Seal Beach which turns into Norwalk Boulevard. The highway continued west on Centralia Road and then north along Pioneer Boulevard until reaching San Antonio Drive at Rosecrans Avenue. San Antonio Drive would turn back into Norwalk Boulevard and continue with that street name until turning into Old Mill Road at Beverly Boulevard. Route 35 would wind through Rose Hills and Avocado Heights as Workman Mill Road and would then turn into Puente Avenue at Valley Boulevard where it would continue to its end at U.S. 99 at the border of Baldwin Park and West Covina. The route was deleted in 1964 due to the replacement by Interstate 605 and SR 35 was redesignated along Skyline Boulevard in the San Francisco Bay Area.

State Route 42

State Route 42 ran from State Route 1 west of Inglewood to State Route 91 near Norwalk, largely along Manchester Avenue and Firestone Boulevard. It was deleted in 2000. The segment east of Interstate 5 (Santa Ana Freeway) was added to State Route 90. The segment west of Interstate 5 was added to the interstate system as Interstate 105. The freeway would not be opened until 1993, which resulted in the original route continuing to be signed as State Route 42. To this day, Route 42 is still sporadically signed in many places.

State Route 69 

State Route 69 began at SR 198 amid Tulare County. It then headed north and intersected SR 216 in Woodlake and CR J27 amid farmland in the county. The route continued to meet SR 201 in Elderwood. After several miles through Tulare County, it crossed into Fresno County, where it met its north end at State Route 180. In 1972, this highway was decommissioned and renumbered SR 245.

State Route 85 (Original) 

From 1963 to 1965, State Route 85 was a 10-11 mile highway that ran entirely on surface streets from US 101 near SR 237 to SR 82 along Mathilda Avenue and Saratoga-Sunnyvale Road (later De Anza Boulevard) between SR 82 and SR 9. The segment north of I-280 was deleted in 1965 once the current northern segment of the freeway opened. The southern segment was deleted in 1994 (the same day the remainder of the current freeway opened) and the route was immediately transferred over to the cities of Cupertino and Saratoga. The route still appeared in the California Transportation Commission's agenda in July 2000.

State Route 106

State Route 106 was originally created in 1964, and ran from State Route 38 in Redlands to State Route 18 in Running Springs. Prior to 1964, the highway was a part of Legislative Route 190, which ran from US 66 to State Route 38. After 1964, the route was split in half. The western portion became State Route 30. The eastern portion was combined with Legislative Route 207, and became State Route 106. A year later, its southern terminus was moved to Interstate 10. In 1972, State Route 106 was decommissioned. The northern portion between State Route 30 and State Route 18 was renumbered to State Route 330. The southern portion was added to State Route 30, extending it to Interstate 10. This also reconnected both halves of the original Legislative Route 190.

State Route 157

State Route 157 was planned to run from I-805 near Ocean View Boulevard in San Diego to SR 125 near the Sweetwater Reservoir, passing through the neighborhood of Paradise Hills. What was known as Route 285 became a state highway in 1959, and was redesignated as SR 157 in the 1964 state highway renumbering. By 1974, plans called for constructing the freeway from Nogal Street across Imperial Avenue to end at SR 54. However, the project was cancelled after objections from the community, and because it was not compatible with any long-term plans. Developments near the western half of the route served to discourage construction, and the plans for the eastern half were cancelled that year; the land was sold soon afterward. The mayor of National City, Kile Morgan, opposed the proposal, citing concerns that many projects for the South Bay were being opposed by others. The route was removed from the law by the Legislature in 1994.

State Route 159

State Route 159  Between July 1, 1964 and the time it was turned back to local authorities, Route 159 was the segment of Linda Vista Avenue in Pasadena between State Route 134, the Ventura Freeway, and Interstate 210, the Foothill Freeway. From July 1, 1964 to 1965, this was also the segment of Figueroa Boulevard between State Route 134 and Interstate 5. In 1965, this was to be deleted when I-210 was completed. Prior to July 1, 1964 it was a segment of California Legislative Route 165 and signed as California State Route 11.

State Route 171

State Route 171 was planned to run from I-5 near San Diego to I-805 through Switzer Canyon. It was to be called the Switzer Canyon Freeway, and had been suggested by consultant John Nolen in 1926. Originally designated as Route 284 in 1959, the route was renumbered as SR 171 in the 1964 state highway renumbering. However, the community opposed the project; it would have passed through Balboa Park and would have gone through canyons, residential districts, and a golf course. SANDAG endorsed the deletion in 1993, and the Legislature deleted the route in 1994.

State Route 176

State Route 176 ran from US 101 in Santa Maria to Sisquoc along Stowell Road, Philbric Road, and Foxen Canyon Road.  Prior to July 1, 1964 it was an unsigned segment of California Legislative Route 148.

State Route 195

State Route 195 connected SR 86 with SR 111. It served as a connector between the two routes while the SR 86 expressway was constructed. This route was deleted in 2014, when the part that was not deleted in 2009 was transferred to SR 111.

State Route 196

State Route 196 was planned to run from Route 2 to Route 249 south of Palmdale. It was deleted before it could be constructed in 1965.

State Route 206

State Route 206 was deleted from the state highway system, with varying reasons. Between July 1, 1964 and the time it was turned back to local authorities, Route 206 ran from Highland Avenue, formerly State Route 30, in San Bernardino along North E Street, Kendall Drive, and Palm Avenue to the Barstow Freeway, Interstate 215, in Verdemont. Prior to July 1, 1964, Route 206 was California Legislative Route 191 and was signed as Business U. S. 66.

State Route 209

State Route 209 connected Point Loma with the interchange of I-5 and I-8 in San Diego. The route began at the Cabrillo National Monument and passed through Fort Rosecrans and the neighborhood of Point Loma via Catalina Boulevard, Canon Street, and Rosecrans Street. This route was deleted in 2003.

State Route 214

State Route 214 was deleted in 1998. Between July 1, 1964 and the time it was turned back to local authorities, Route 214 ran between Lakewood Boulevard, then State Route 19, in Long Beach and the Santa Ana Freeway, Interstate 5, in Anaheim. Route 214 traversed Carson Street in Los Angeles County (between Route 19 and the Los Angeles/Orange County Line). It continued into Orange County on Lincoln Avenue (between the Los Angeles/Orange County Line and Route 5). Prior to July 1, 1964, Route 214 was a segment of California Legislative Route 178. Between 1962 and July 1, 1964 it was signed as US 91.  Before 1962, it was signed as both US 91 and State Route 18.

State Route 224

State Route 224 was a spur route connecting U.S. Route 101 in Carpinteria to Carpinteria State Beach. From US 101, it ran south along Casitas Pass Road, then west on Carpinteria Avenue before heading south again along Palm Avenue to the beach's entrance. The route was defined in the 1964 state highway renumbering, then deleted in 1996.

State Route 228

State Route 228 was to be a short bypass west of Brawley. However, this was also included in the 1935 definition of Route 26, which continued north to Los Angeles and south to Calexico, along the approximate route of US 99. The route was deleted in 1998; by that time, no highway had been constructed along this route.

State Route 231

State Route 231 was a designation for a state highway from SR 86 to SR 195 near Mecca. In 1935, the route was added to the state highway system. Two years later, the route was given the designation of Route 204. In the 1964 state highway renumbering, the route was renumbered as SR 231. The Division of Highways proposed deleting this state highway in 1971, The routing was removed from the state highway system in 1972.

SR 231 was later used for what is now SR 261 and SR 241.

State Route 250

State Route 250 was the designation for State College Boulevard from I-5 in Orange to SR 91. The routing was only a temporary routing and the route ceased to be a state highway when the adjacent SR 57 freeway was completed.

State Route 252

State Route 252 was to connect I-5 to I-805, and provide almost direct access from I-805 to I-5, near the southern terminus of SR 15. The route would have run parallel to, and approximately halfway between, the current alignment of SR 94 and SR 54.

SR 252 was defined as Route 283 in 1959, and was redesignated as Route 252 in the 1964 state highway renumbering. The California Highway Commission reviewed a  proposal for the route in 1965. It was known as the El Toyon Freeway, and plans were to use it to balance the congestion between I-5 and I-805. By 1973, there was opposition based on concerns that it would split the community; according to an engineer from Caltrans, it was "a white man's freeway vs. a black community." If the freeway was not constructed, the federal government would stand to lose $10 million. The Comprehensive Planning Organization in 1974 proposed widening arterial streets nearby as an alternative, even though the construction would affect 240 buildings. Meanwhile, relocation of 280 households and the start of demolition had taken place.

In 1977, a local vote took place to determine what to construct or if SR 252 should be constructed; however, $4.4 million had already been spent to construct the 43rd street interchange with I-805. Alternate plans included a city street and constructing a below-grade freeway. By 1980, the California Transportation Commission had canceled plans to construct SR 252, due to the residential opposition. The city of National City made attempts to have the plans reinstated in 1986 to reduce congestion within city limits. The city of San Diego opposed the idea of constructing an additional freeway, while the county supported it. The state told Caltrans to sell the land to the city of San Diego, though National City expressed interest in purchasing it, even though there would be San Diego city permits needed to construct a freeway on it. National City then sued the state, but agreed to drop the suit in exchange for $10 million in traffic improvements on behalf of the city of San Diego.

In 1993, the San Diego Association of Governments and Caltrans planned to have SR 252, along with SR 157 and SR 171, officially removed; the abandoned land was to be used for residential purposes. The state legislature removed from the state highway system in 1994.

State Route 256

State Route 256 was a proposed highway from I-80 to State Route 65 north of Roseville, and was deleted in 1994. This was originally signed as part of Route 65, and of US 99E through Roseville. Route 256, a once adopted route for a west-side bypass of Roseville was rescinded by the California Transportation Commission in 1976 because of cost and difficulty of crossing the Southern Pacific Switchyard.

State Route 274

State Route 274 ran along Balboa Avenue, entirely within the city of San Diego. The highway started at I-5 in Pacific Beach before continuing east into Kearny Mesa and intersecting I-805 and SR 163 before ending at I-15. Balboa Avenue still exists as a road between I-5 and I-15.

Balboa Avenue was constructed in Pacific Beach by 1956, and east into Clairemont by 1961. The Legislature designated the route as from I-5 to SR 103 in 1965, changing SR 103 to SR 15 in 1969. Between 1969 and 1970, Balboa Avenue was completed from I-5 to SR 163 and signed as SR 274. Completion of the route to I-15 was in place by 1982. The route was deleted from state laws in 1999, and given to the city of San Diego in 2001.

State Route 285

State Route 285 was defined in 1970 as Route 70 on West Street in Portola northwesterly to the north city limits, then to Lake Davis via Humbug Canyon, and then easterly to Grizzly Reservoir via the south shore of the lake. This was deleted in 1998 because of problems with the right of way and drainage. The route was never constructed. According to the Caltrans photolog, the old alignment for Route 285 essentially is exactly the same as existing West Street (in Portola) and Lake Davis Road northeast to Grizzly Road just northeast of the Big Grizzly Creek.

State Route 480 
 

State Route 480 was a state highway in San Francisco consisting of the elevated double-decker Embarcadero Freeway (also known as the Embarcadero Skyway), the partly elevated Doyle Drive approach to the Golden Gate Bridge and the proposed and unbuilt section in between. The unbuilt section from Doyle Drive to Van Ness Avenue was to have been called the Golden Gate Freeway and the Embarcadero Freeway as originally planned would have extended from Van Ness along the north side of Bay Street and then along the Embarcadero to the San Francisco-Oakland Bay Bridge.

The Embarcadero Freeway, which had only been constructed from Broadway along the Embarcadero to the Bay Bridge, was universally panned with many locals comparing it to the Alaskan Way Viaduct in Seattle. Demands to demolish the freeway were proposed as early as 1963 with the San Francisco Board of Supervisors supporting the proposal. The freeway was eventually demolished after the 1989 Loma Prieta earthquake, and Doyle Drive is now part of U.S. Route 101. SR 480 was Interstate 480, an auxiliary route of the Interstate Highway System, from 1955 to 1965. The entire route was deleted in 1991, approximately two years after the earthquake.

See also

References

External links
California Highways

High